Žandov is a town in Česká Lípa District in the Liberec Region of the Czech Republic. It has about 1,900 inhabitants.

Administrative parts
Villages of Dolní Police, Heřmanice, Novosedlo, Radeč, Valteřice and Velká Javorská are administrative parts of Žandov.

Geography
It lies in the Central Bohemian Uplands. The Ploučnice River flows through the town.

References

External links

Cities and towns in the Czech Republic